Petersburg is a rural unincorporated community and census-designated place (CDP) in Boone County, Kentucky, United States. As of the 2010 census Petersburg, along with its surrounding areas that use the 41080 zip code, had a population of 620. It is located 25 miles away from Cincinnati, Ohio.

Archaeological evidence reveals an ancient Indian settlement was located at Petersburg town site. The first white settlement at Petersburg was Tanner's Station, an outpost founded before 1790. Tanner's station was the first settlement in Boone County, KY. Tanner's Station was renamed Petersburg in 1814.

The Bullittsburg Baptist Church was founded outside the former hamlets of Utzinger and Gainesville/Idewild, east and north of Petersburg, in 1794.

Petersburg contains the Creation Museum, operated by Answers in Genesis.

Demographics

Education
Petersburg had a public library, a branch of the Boone County Public Library.

Notable natives
Charles Clinton Fleek, recipient of the Medal of Honor for service in the Vietnam War. "Chalky", as he was known, attended the 5 classroom, Petersburg Elementary School which has since been demolished/converted into a local community center and branch of the Boone County Public Library.

See also

 Ronald Watson Gravel Site

References 

Unincorporated communities in Kentucky
Census-designated places in Kentucky
Census-designated places in Boone County, Kentucky
Kentucky populated places on the Ohio River
Unincorporated communities in Boone County, Kentucky